Virginia's 73rd House of Delegates district elects one of 100 seats in the Virginia House of Delegates, the lower house of the state's bicameral legislature. The district covers part of Henrico County. District 73 has been represented by Rodney Willett since 2020.

District officeholders

References

External links
 

Virginia House of Delegates districts
Government in Henrico County, Virginia